Joseph Toluwadara Ladapo is an English-born Nigerian professional footballer who plays as a forward for League One club Charlton Athletic.

Career

Charlton Athletic
Coming through the youth system of Charlton Athletic, Ladapo signed his first professional contract with the club on 11 July 2022.

He made his professional debut for Charlton, coming off the bench in the 85th minute of a 3–0 EFL Trophy victory at home against Gillinghan on 31 August 2022.

Career statistics

References

External links
 

Living people
English footballers
Charlton Athletic F.C. players
Association football forwards
2004 births